Giano II di Campofregoso (1455–1529) was the 43rd Doge of Genoa, ruling from 29 June 1512 to 25 May 1513.

The son of Tommasino Fregoso and Caterina Malaspina, he first trained in Corsica, then moved to Rome where he received a cavalry command by Pope Julius II. In 1506, together with his kinsman Ottaviano di Campofregoso, he led an army against Genoa but halted his march after he was reconciled with the nobles who had allied with France. Julius subsequently assigned him the command of Lunigiana. In 1512 he led another military expedition against Genoa, which he freed from the last French garrisons. This victory gained him the title of doge on 29 June that year.

His rule lasted for a year, after plots of the Fieschi and Adorno families led again the Republic towards the French King Louis XII. Giano left the city on a ship on 25 May 1513, serving the rival Republic of Venice as a land commander in the Wars in Lombardy. In 1516 he defeated the army of emperor Maximilian I in the battle of Rocca d'Anfo near Brescia. He died in the latter  city in 1525.

He is buried in the church of Santa Anastasia in Verona.

External links
 retrieved 3 May 2008
Campofregoso Dogi (Italian) retrieved 3 May 2008

1455 births
1529 deaths
16th-century Doges of Genoa
15th-century condottieri
Giano 02
Military personnel from Genoa
16th-century condottieri